A syssel is a historical type of country subdivision in Denmark and elsewhere in Scandinavia. The mediaeval Danish sysler may be compared to the fylker of Norway, the landskaps of Sweden and Finland, the shires of England and Scotland, and the Gaue of the Holy Roman Empire. A syssel was subdivided into a number of hundreds or herreder.

The name still can be found in the Danish district of Vendsyssel, as well as in a governmental title, sýslumenn, in Iceland, the Faroe Islands, and Svalbard.

Jutland

Sysler and hundreds:
 Vendsyssel: Horns Herred, Vennebjerg Herred, Børglum Herred, Jerslev Herred, Hvetbo Herred, Kær Herred
 Thysyssel: Hillerslev Herred, Hundborg Herred, Hassing Herred, Refs Herred
 Sallingsyssel:  Morsø Nørre Herred, Morsø Sønder Herred, Salling Nørre Herred, Harre Herred, Rødding Herred, Hindborg Herred and Fjends Herred)
 Himmersyssel:  Slet Herred, Hornum Herred, Fleskum Herred, Års Herred, Hellum Herred, Gislum Herred, Hindsted Herred and Rinds Herred
 Ommersyssel:  Nørlyng Herred, Sønderlyng Herred, Middelsom Herred, Onsild Herred, Nørhald Herred, Gerlev Herred and Støvring Herred
 Hardsyssel:  Vandfuld Herred, Skodborg Herred, Hjerm Herred, Ginding Herred, Ulfborg Herred, Hammerum Herred, Hind Herred and Bølling Herred)
 Åbosyssel:  Houlbjerg Herred, Galten Herred, Sønderhald Herred, Rougsø Herred, Djurs Nørre Herred, Djurs Sønder Herred, Mols Herred, Øster Lisbjerg Herred, Vester Lisbjerg Herred, Sabro Herred, Gjern Herred, Hjelmslev Herred, Framlev Herred, Hasle Herred, Ning Herred
 Loversyssel: Lysgård Herred, Hids Herred, Vrads Herred, Tyrsting Herred, Nim Herred, Hatting Herred, Bjerre Herred, Voer Herred, Hads Herred
 Hansyssel: Hanherred
 Vardesyssel: Vester Horne Herred, Nørre Horne Herred, Øster Horne Herred, Skast Herred, Gørding Herred, Malt Herred
 Jellingsyssel:  Nørvang Herred and Tørrild Herred
 Almindsyssel:  Jerlev Herred, Andst Herred, Brusk Herred, Holmans Herred and Elbo Herred
 Barvidsyssel:  Tyrstrup Herred, Gram Herred (eastern half), Rangstrup Herreder and Haderslev Herred
 Ellumsyssel:  Hviding Herred, Højer Herred, Lø Herred, Kær Herred, Slogs Herred, Rise Herred, Lundtoft Herred, Sundeved and a small part of eastern Søndre Rangstrup Herred
 Istedsyssel: Nørre & Sønder Gøs Herreder, Vis Herred, Ugle Herred, Husby Herred, Ny Herred, Strukstrup Herred, Slis Herred and Arns Herred.

Greenland 
Before the administrative reform in Greenland of November 18, 1950, there were 12 syssel in West Greenland.
South Greenland (Sydgrønlands Landsråd)
Julianehaab Syssel
Frederikshaab Syssel
Godthaab Syssel
Sukkertoppen Syssel
Holsteinsborg Syssel
North Greenland (Nordgrønlands Landsråd) – not to be confused with later Avannaa
Godhavn Syssel
Egedesminde Syssel
Christianshaab Syssel
Jakobshavn Syssel
Ritenbenk Syssel
Umanak Syssel
Upernavik Syssel

See also
 Sýsla

References

Types of administrative division
Administrative divisions in Europe